Kent Gap is an ice-filled gap connecting the heads of May Valley and Chambers Glacier and marking the divide between Lexington Table and Saratoga Table, in the Forrestal Range of the Pensacola Mountains, Antarctica. It was mapped by the United States Geological Survey from surveys and U.S. Navy air photos, 1956–66, and was named by the Advisory Committee on Antarctic Names for Kenneth K. Kent, an electronics technician at Ellsworth Station, winter 1957.

References

Mountain passes of Antarctica
Landforms of Queen Elizabeth Land
Pensacola Mountains